Alexandru Nicolae Bădoiu (born 17 August 1981, in Pucioasa) is a retired Romanian football player.

Bădoiu started his career at FCM Reşiţa before moving to Jiul Petroşani, where he won promotion to the first league. He was transferred by FCU Politehnica Timişoara in the summer of 2006, for 400.000 Euros, but returned in the winter of the same year to Jiul, for a fraction of that sum.

See also
Football in Romania
List of football clubs in Romania

References

External links

1981 births
Living people
People from Pucioasa
Romanian footballers
FC Politehnica Timișoara players
CSM Jiul Petroșani players
Association football defenders